A list of NCAA college football seasons at the highest level, now known as the Division I Football Bowl Subdivision (FBS), since Division I split for football only in 1978. The split created the new Divisions I-A and I-AA; in 2006, they were respectively renamed FBS and FCS (with FCS standing for Football Championship Subdivision).

Division I-A

Division I FBS

The following table summarizes the articles linked above.

See also
List of NCAA Division I-AA/FCS football seasons

References